Lophothoracia is a genus of snout moths. It was described by George Hampson in 1901.

Species
 Lophothoracia omphalella Hampson, 1901
 Lophothoracia orthozona (Lower 1903)

References

Phycitini
Pyralidae genera